The Bookstall series was a series of books published by the NSW Bookstall Company from 1904 onwards. Among the novelists published under the series were Ambrose Pratt and Arthur Wright. The books were sold for one shilling and consisted of Australian authors and topics. It was the idea of A. C. Rowlandson.

References

External links
Bookstall series at AustLit

1904 books
Australian books
Australian literature
20th-century Australian literature
Series of books